Karl Schmitzer (April 22, 1926 in Afing (Lower Austria) – October 19, 2011 in St. Pölten) was an Austrian politician, member of National Council  (1970–1981).

References

1926 births
2011 deaths
Austrian politicians